Clinical Therapeutics is a monthly peer-reviewed medical journal that was established in 1977 and is published by Elsevier. The journal covers all aspects of clinical pharmacology and therapeutics.

Abstracting and indexing 
The journal is abstracted and indexed in:

According to the Journal Citation Reports, the journal has a 2016 impact factor of 2.947.

References

External links 
 

Pharmacology journals
Publications established in 1979
Monthly journals
English-language journals
Elsevier academic journals